Ricardo da Costa Pateiro (born 31 May 1980 in Palmela, Setúbal District) is a Portuguese retired footballer who played as a left midfielder.

References

External links

1980 births
Living people
Sportspeople from Setúbal District
Portuguese footballers
Association football midfielders
Primeira Liga players
Liga Portugal 2 players
Segunda Divisão players
Lusitano G.C. players
S.C.U. Torreense players
C.D. Pinhalnovense players
C.D. Nacional players
U.D. Leiria players
Rio Ave F.C. players
S.C. Pombal players